The Smith-Little-Mars House is a historic mansion in LaFollette, Tennessee, USA. It was listed on the National Register of Historic Places in 1976.  Built in 1840 by slaves for Frank Smith in the Federal style, the house is one of the few antebellum homes remaining in the area.  It is conjectured that the slaves who built the house belonged to Frank Kincaid II, because of the similarity in design and brickwork to other houses in Campbell and Clairborne counties.  In the late 1890s, the house was purchased by Silas Little, a wealthy clothing store owner, who added Victorian embellishments.

References

Houses on the National Register of Historic Places in Tennessee
Victorian architecture in Tennessee
Houses completed in 1840
Buildings and structures in Campbell County, Tennessee
National Register of Historic Places in Campbell County, Tennessee